Kendujhar is a town with municipality in Kendujhar District in the Indian state of  Odisha.  It is the administrative headquarters of the Kendujhar district, and it is one of the fifth scheduled areas of Odisha.

Climate

Politics 
Mohan charan Majhi of BJP is the current MLA from Keonjhar assembly constituency. Mohan Charan Majhi won assembly elections in both 2004 and 2000. Earlier MLAs from this seat were Jogendra Naik of BJP (1995), C. Majhi of JD (1990), Chhotaray Majhi of JNP (1985), Jogendra Naik of INC(I) in 1980 and Kumar Majhi of JNP (1977).

Present MP from Keonjhar (Lok Sabha constituency) is Chandrani Murmu of BJD.

Gallery
Some images of keonjhar.

.

References

External links
 
 Satellite map
 Government of India website for Kendujhar

Cities and towns in Kendujhar district